Alonso Velázquez (1533 – 14 January 1587) was a Roman Catholic prelate who served as Archbishop of Santiago de Compostela (1583–1587) and Bishop of Osma (1578–1583).

Biography
Alonso Velázquez was born in Tudela del Duero, Spain. On 13 June 1578, he was appointed during the papacy of Pope Gregory XIII as Bishop of Osma. In September 1578, he was consecrated bishop by Gaspar de Quiroga y Vela, Archbishop of Toledo. On 9 March 1583, he was appointed during the papacy of Pope Gregory XIII as Archbishop of Santiago de Compostela. He served as Archbishop of Santiago de Compostela until his death on 14 January 1587. While bishop, he was the principal consecrator of Pedro Fernández Temiño, Bishop of Ávila.

References

External links and additional sources
 (for Chronology of Bishops) 
 (for Chronology of Bishops) 
 (for Chronology of Bishops) 
 (for Chronology of Bishops) 

16th-century Roman Catholic archbishops in Spain
1533 births
1587 deaths
Bishops appointed by Pope Gregory XIII